Fred G. McCune was an architect based in Wichita, Kansas.

Several of his works are listed on the U.S. National Register of Historic Places.

S.S. Voigt, a noted architect of churches and schools, worked for McCune for a period, before forming his own firm.

Works by McCune (with attribution) include:
Caldwell Carnegie Library, 13 N. Osage St. Caldwell, Kansas (McCune, Fred G.), NRHP-listed
Kingman Carnegie Library, 455 N. Main Kingman, Kansas (McCune, Fred C.), NRHP-listed
Stoner Apartment Building, 938-940 North Market Wichita, Kansas (McCune, Fred C.), NRHP-listed
One or more works in Wichita Historic Warehouse and Jobbers District, Wichita, Kansas (McCune, Fred G.), NRHP-listed

References

Architects from Kansas